Bnot Beit Shean (lit.: Beit She'an Girls) was an Israeli women's football club from Beit She'an. The club competed in the Israeli Women's League and the Israeli Women's Cup between 2004 and 2007. At the end of the 2006–07 season the club folded.

History
The club was founded in 2004 and joined the Israeli women's football league. The club played the 2004–05 season in the Northern division, finishing bottom, after losing its 8 matches in the division, conceding 100 goals in the club's first league matches and 174 goals overall. At the second half of the season the club played at the bottom group, and finished 10th out of 11 teams, scoring its first and only victory against bottom club, Ironi Ariel. The following season, the club again finished last in the Northern division, and finished last in the bottom group.
At the beginning of the 2006–07 season, the IFA split the women's league into two division, and the club was placed in the second division. The club finished the season at the 3rd place (out of 5 teams), and at the end of the season folded, as did all the clubs which played in the second division.

Seasons

References

External links
Bnot Beit She'an IFA 

Women's football clubs in Israel
Association football clubs established in 2004
Association football clubs disestablished in 2007
Defunct football clubs in Israel